Steedman may refer to:

People
Alasdair Steedman (1922–1992), senior commander in the Royal Air Force
Bertha Steedman (1866–1945), British tennis player, nine times All-England doubles champion
George Fox Steedman (1871–1940), American businessman from St. Louis, MO, US
Henry Steedman (1866–1953), Scottish-born Australian botanist
Ian Steedman (born 1941), professor of economics in Manchester, England
James B. Steedman (1817–1883), American soldier, printer, and politician
Mark Steedman, FBA, FRSE (born 1946), computational linguist and cognitive scientist
Neville Steedman (born 1957), Irish soccer player during the 1980s
Peggy Steedman (1905–1975), Scottish chess master
Peter Steedman (born 1943), Australia politician
Shirley Steedman (born 1950), British actor
Tony Steedman (1927–2001), British actor

Places
Steedman, Missouri, unincorporated community in Callaway County in the U.S. state of Missouri
Steedman Estate or Casa del Herrero, home and gardens in Montecito near Santa Barbara, California
Steedman-Ray House or 1925 F Street Club, historic home, the official residence of the President of The George Washington University

Other
Morris and Steedman, architecture firm based in Edinburgh, Scotland

See also
Steadman (disambiguation)
Stedman (disambiguation)